Pinckneyville, also spelled as Pinkneyville, is an unincorporated community in Clay County, Alabama, United States.

History
Pinckneyville was named in honor of Thomas Pinckney. At one point, Pinckneyville was home to two churches, a general store, two grist mills, and a cotton gin. A group of men from Pinckneyville were mustered into Hilliard's Legion. A post office operated under the name Pinckneyville from 1840 to 1903.

A type of granodiorite known as Pinckneyville granite is found in the area and named for Pinckneyville.

References

Unincorporated communities in Clay County, Alabama
Unincorporated communities in Alabama